Manuel V. Domenech Ferrer (23 March 1869 – 15 March 1942) was a Puerto Rican politician and engineer. He was mayor of Ponce in 1904, and designer of Casa Armstrong-Poventud, Rosaly-Batiz House, and the 1898 Casas Gemelas (Twin Houses) built for Luis Casals, among others prominent structures.

Early years
Domenech was born in Isabela, Puerto Rico on 23 March 1869. He graduated from Lehigh University, Pennsylvania, United States in 1888. Domenech was also educated at Rensselaer Polytechnic Institute. Studying at Lehigh University exposed Domenech to life in the state of  Pennsylvania at a time when that state was experiencing accelerated development in modernistic architecture. Likewise, his education at Rensselaer exposed him to the most advanced techniques in engineering and architecture training available at the time. Located in Troy, New York, Rensselaer also exposed the young student to a region experiencing a great amount of growth and architectural transformation during his time there.

Political career
After his return to Puerto Rico, he became was a member of the House of Representatives from 1900 to 1902, and mayor of Ponce in 1904. In 1914 he was named Commissioner in the United States Department of the Interior, becoming one of the first Puerto Rican to hold a presidentially appointed Puerto Rico Cabinet position.  Later he was Treasurer of Puerto Rico, from 1930 to 1935. In various occasions he also served as Acting Governor of Puerto Rico. Domenech attended the 1928 Republican National Convention in Kansas City, Missouri as an alternate delegate.

Engineer
Domenech is also known to have acted as municipal architect for the city of Ponce. He was a civil engineer and, in 1914, also rehabilitated the house where "King of Tenors" Antonio Paoli was born and grew up.

Death and burial
Domenech died in 1942 in San Juan, Puerto Rico. He is buried at Puerto Rico Memorial Cemetery in Carolina, Puerto Rico.

Honors
After his death, a major roadway in Hato Rey, Puerto Rico, was named after him.  Domenech is also honored at Ponce's Park of the Illustrious Ponce Citizens. In Ponce, there is a street in Urbanizacion Las Delicias of Barrio Magueyes named after him.

See also
 List of Puerto Ricans

References

Further reading
 Fay Fowlie de Flores. Ponce, Perla del Sur: Una Bibliografía Anotada. Segunda Edición. 1997. Ponce, Puerto Rico: Universidad de Puerto Rico en Ponce. p. 381. Item 1873. 
 Manuel V. Domenech. Mensaje al Concejo Municipal. Ponce. Oficina del Alcalde. 1904? (AHMP)

1869 births
1942 deaths
Governors of Puerto Rico
Mayors of Ponce, Puerto Rico
Members of the House of Representatives of Puerto Rico
Lehigh University alumni
Puerto Rican architects
People from Isabela, Puerto Rico
Secretaries of Treasury of Puerto Rico